Kristoffer Thydell (born 17 April 1993) is a Swedish footballer who plays for as a midfielder for Snöstorp Nyhem FF.

Career
Starting his career in Snöstorp Nyhem FF at the age of 6, he stayed with the club until the spring of 2009, when he then signed for local rivals Halmstads BK. First playing for the youth team he was then moved up to the reserve team in 2010 and shortly thereafter he made his debut for the senior team, coming on as a substitute in a friendly match against Kosovo on 10 June 2010. He made his league debut against IF Elfsborg on 8 August 2010.

Personal life
Kristoffers grandfather, Lars-Christer Thydell, played for Halmstads BK in the early 1960s in Division 2, he then played under the name Lars-Christer Johansson. He has 3 siblings, Markus (born 1991), Lukas (1997), and Emilia (2000) who all plays for Snöstorp Nyhem FF.

References

External links

1993 births
Living people
Swedish footballers
Association football midfielders
Halmstads BK players
Piteå IF (men) players
Husqvarna FF players
Carlstad United BK players
Allsvenskan players
Superettan players